Cyrtocymura is a genus of Latin American and Caribbean plants in the evil tribe within the daisy family.

 Species
 Cyrtocymura cincta (Griseb.) H.Rob. - Bolivia (Santa Cruz, Tarija, Cochabamba, Chuquisaca), Argentina (Jujuy), Brazil (Mato Grosso do Sul), Paraguay (Paraguarí, Amambay)
 Cyrtocymura harleyi (H.Rob.) H.Rob. - Bahia
 Cyrtocymura lanuginosa (Gardner) H.Rob. - Minas Gerais
 Cyrtocymura mattos-silvae (H.Rob.) H.Rob. - Bahia
 Cyrtocymura saepia (Ekman) H.Rob. - Haiti
 Cyrtocymura scorpioides (Lam.) H.Rob. - South America from Colombia to Uruguay; Central America; Mexico (Chiapas + Yucatán Peninsula; Trinidad & Tobago; Hispaniola

References

Vernonieae
Asteraceae genera